Zhong Acheng (born 1949), often known by his pseudonym Ah Cheng, is a Chinese author and screenwriter.

In 1979, together with He Dong, Ma Desheng, Wang Keping, Huang Rui, Li Shuang, Qu Leilei and Ai Weiwei, Ah Cheng founded the Stars Group (XingXing), an assembly of untrained, experimental artists who challenged the strict tenets of Chinese politics. As a political and artistic group, they staged exhibitions around Beijing, making way for avant-garde art in China. He won the 1992 International Nonino Prize in Italy.

Works

Screenplays
Yue Yue (1986)
Hibiscus Town (Furong zhen, 1986)
Painted Skin (Hua pi zhi yinyang fawang, 1992)
Springtime in a Small Town (Xiao cheng zhi chun, 2002)
The Go Master (Wu qingyuan, 2006)
The Assassin (Ci ke nie yin niang, 2015)

Novels
Qi wang, (The Chess Master)
Hai zi wang, (The King of Children)
Shu wang, (The King of Trees")Kong fen, (Unfilled Graves)The King of Trees A Collection of his three novels Qi wang (The King of Chess) Shu wang (King of Trees) Hai zi wang (King of Children) published by New Directions Publishing in 2010.Three Kings: Three Stories from Today's China'' (trans. by Bonnie McDougall), published 1990 by Collins-Harvill (London).

References

External links
 

1949 births
Living people
Screenwriters from Beijing
Chinese male short story writers
20th-century Chinese short story writers
International Writing Program alumni
20th-century Chinese male writers
People's Republic of China novelists
People's Republic of China short story writers
Short story writers from Beijing